The 1993 Ohio Valley Conference men's basketball tournament was the final event of the 1992–93 season in the Ohio Valley Conference. The tournament was held March 4–6, 1993, at Rupp Arena in Lexington, Kentucky.

 defeated  in the championship game, 82–68, to win their first OVC men's basketball tournament.

The Tigers received an automatic bid to the 1993 NCAA tournament as the No. 15 seed in the Southeast region.

Format
Six of the nine conference members participated in the tournament field. They were seeded based on regular season conference records, with the top two seeds (Tennessee State and Eastern Kentucky) receiving a bye to the semifinal round. The teams were re-seeded after the opening round.

Bracket

References

Ohio Valley Conference men's basketball tournament
Tournament
Ohio Valley Conference men's basketball tournament
Ohio Valley Conference men's basketball tournament
Basketball competitions in Lexington, Kentucky
College basketball tournaments in Kentucky